Banat is  a geographical and historical region of southeastern Europe.

Banat may also refer to:

Places
 Banat, India, a town in Uttar Pradesh
 Banat, Iran, a village in Kerman Province, Iran
 Eparchy of Banat, a diocese or eparchy of the Serbian Orthodox Church in the Banat region, Serbia
 Banat, Michigan, a village in the United States

Historical
 Banate of Severin, a Hungarian province that existed between the 13th and the 16th centuries
 Banate of Lugos and Karánsebes, a Hungarian province that existed in the 16th century
 Banat of Craiova, a Habsburg province that existed between 1718 and 1739
 Banat of Temeswar, a Habsburg province that existed between 1718 and 1778
 Voivodeship of Serbia and Temes Banat, a voivodship (duchy) of the Austrian Empire that existed between 1849 and 1860
 Banat Republic, a short-lived state, proclaimed in Timișoara in 1918
 Banat, Bačka and Baranja, a de facto province of the Kingdom of Serbia and the Kingdom of Serbs, Croats and Slovenes between 1918 and 1919
 Banat (1941–1944), an autonomous region within the German-administered Territory of the Military Commander in Serbia between 1941 and 1944

Other uses
 Banat News, a Cebuano language tabloid in the Philippines
 Banat (film), a 2015 Italian-Romanian-Bulgarian-Macedonian drama film
 FK Banat Zrenjanin, a Serbian football club from Zrenjanin that plays in the Serbian Premier League
 Phoenix Banat Storm, an American soccer team founded in 2006

See also
 Banat Bulgarians
 Banat Krajina, a section of the Habsburg Monarchy's Military Frontier in the Banat region
 Banat Swabians
 Demographic history of Serbian Banat
 Central Banat District, a district in Serbia
 North Banat District, a district in Serbia
 South Banat District, a district in Serbia
 
 Banate (disambiguation)
 Banatić ("Little Banat" in Serbian), a quarter of the city of Novi Sad, Serbia